Ulearum donburnsii is a species of plant in the family Araceae. Native to the Amazonian lowlands of Ecuador, it can be distinguished from its relative Ulearum sagittatum by the finer, thread-like staminodes on its spadix. It has arrowhead-shaped leaves and grows terrestrially from small rhizomes. The species was described in 2003 and named for Don Burns, a noted grower of aroids and a member of the International Aroid Society.

References

Aroideae
Plants described in 2002